The Minister of Uddarbo (Swedish: Prästen i Uddarbo) is a 1957 Swedish drama film directed by Kenne Fant and starring Max von Sydow, Ann-Marie Gyllenspetz and Anders Henrikson. It was shot at the Kungsholmen Studios of Nordisk Tonefilm in Stockholm. The film's sets were designed by the art director Bibi Lindström.

Cast
 Max von Sydow as 	Gustaf Ömark
 Ann-Marie Gyllenspetz as Hanna
 Anders Henrikson as 	Teodor
 Holger Löwenadler as 	Alsing
 Erik Strandmark as 	Ris Erik Eriksson
 Georg Rydeberg as 	Naaman
 Olof Thunberg as 	Per Halvarsson
 Tord Stål as Bishop of Västerås
 Björn Berglund as 	Chairman
 Maud Elfsiö as 	Inger
 John Norrman as 	Johannes
 Gudrun Brost as 	Albertina, aka Gäs-Fröken
 Elsa Ebbesen as Amalia Larsson, teacher
 Georg Adelly as 	Shop Assistant
 Svenerik Perzon as 	Rutger 
 Artur Cederborgh as 	Farmer 
 Claes Thelander as 	Doctor in Uppsala
 Yngve Nordwall as 	Teacher 
 Ingmar Lind as 	Göte
 Bengt Sundmark as 	Worker in Uppsala
 Aurore Palmgren as 	Old vicar's wife 
 Ingvar Kjellson as 	Doctor
 Gunnar Öhlund as 	Lumberjack 
 Brita Öberg as 	Woman at Christening

References

Bibliography 
 Qvist, Per Olov & von Bagh, Peter. Guide to the Cinema of Sweden and Finland. Greenwood Publishing Group, 2000.

External links 
 

1957 films
Swedish drama films
1957 drama films
1950s Swedish-language films
Films directed by Kenne Fant
Swedish black-and-white films
1950s Swedish films